Dionatan Machado de Oliveira (born 22 December 1992), commonly known as Tinga, is a Brazilian professional footballer who plays as a midfielder.

Career
He formerly played for Santos, Caxias, Cianorte, Caldense, Legião, Guaratinguetá, Santa Rita, Grêmio Barueri, Pelotas, Central, Universitario, Al-Batin, Saham, Al-Dhaid, and  Masfout

Persik Kediri
On 5 July 2021, Tinga signed one-year contract with Persik Kediri from the Indonesian Liga 1. He made his league debut for Persik Kediri on 3 October, in the sixth week when Persik faced PSS Sleman, Sunday.  He was finally able to experience Indonesian football competition, he came on in the 50th minute to replace Krisna Bayu Otto, but, until the end of the match Persik had to draw 0–0 with PSS Sleman. On 21 October, Tinga provided a three assist in a 4–2 league win against Persipura Jayapura as well as being the man of the match. On 30 October, Tinga scored his first goal for the team, scoring in a 2–2 draw over Persija Jakarta at the Manahan Stadium.

In July 2022, he signed a contract with Vietnamese club Hong Linh Ha Tinh.

References

External links
Dionathan Machado at Soccerway

1992 births
Living people
Brazilian footballers
Brazilian expatriate footballers
Sociedade Esportiva e Recreativa Caxias do Sul players
Santos FC players
Cianorte Futebol Clube players
Associação Atlética Caldense players
Guaratinguetá Futebol players
Associação Atlética Santa Rita players
Grêmio Barueri Futebol players
Esporte Clube Pelotas players
Central Sport Club players
Universitario de Sucre footballers
Al Batin FC players
Saham SC players
Al Dhaid SC players
Masfout Club players
Persik Kediri players
Campeonato Brasileiro Série D players
Bolivian Primera División players
Saudi Professional League players
Oman Professional League players
UAE First Division League players
Liga 1 (Indonesia) players
Expatriate footballers in Bolivia
Expatriate footballers in Saudi Arabia
Expatriate footballers in Oman
Expatriate footballers in the United Arab Emirates
Expatriate footballers in Indonesia
Brazilian expatriate sportspeople in Bolivia
Brazilian expatriate sportspeople in Saudi Arabia
Brazilian expatriate sportspeople in Oman
Brazilian expatriate sportspeople in the United Arab Emirates
Brazilian expatriate sportspeople in Indonesia
Association football wingers